Andreas Zisimos (born 31 December 1983) is a freestyle swimmer from Greece. He won two medals at the 2005 Mediterranean Games, and represented his native country at two consecutive Summer Olympics, starting in 2004.

References
 

1983 births
Living people
Greek male swimmers
Greek male freestyle swimmers
Olympic swimmers of Greece
Swimmers at the 2004 Summer Olympics
Swimmers at the 2008 Summer Olympics
Swimmers from Athens
European Aquatics Championships medalists in swimming
Mediterranean Games silver medalists for Greece
Mediterranean Games bronze medalists for Greece
Swimmers at the 2005 Mediterranean Games
Mediterranean Games medalists in swimming